Ximenia is a genus of flowering plants in the family Olacaceae.  The generic name honors Francisco Ximénez, a Spanish priest.

Selected species 
 Ximenia americana L.
 Ximenia caffra (large sourplum) Sond.
 Ximenia coriacea Engl.
 Ximenia roigii León

Formerly placed here 
 Balanites aegyptiaca (L.) Delile (as X. aegyptiaca L.)

Image gallery

References

External links

Olacaceae
Santalales genera
Taxonomy articles created by Polbot